Lautaro Bazán Velez (born 24 February 1996 in Córdoba) is an Argentine rugby union player who has represented his country at 15–a-side and rugby sevens. He plays as a scrum-half for the Rovigo Delta in Italian Top10.
 
Bazán played for Argentina in 15 a side rugby union at junior level, and won bronze at the 2016 U20 World Championships in England. He won gold at the 2019 Pan American Games in Lima, Peru. He was named in the Argentina squad for the Rugby sevens at the 2020 Summer Olympics.

In summer 2022 he was named in the full Argentina squad. He also previously played for Argentina from 2016 to 2020. In November 2022 he was again called up to the full Argentina squad whilst they touring the northern hemisphere.

References

External Links 
It'Rugby England profile

1996 births
Living people
Argentine rugby union players
Argentine rugby sevens players
Olympic rugby sevens players of Argentina
Rugby sevens players at the 2020 Summer Olympics
Pan American Games gold medalists for Argentina
Pan American Games medalists in rugby sevens
Rugby sevens players at the 2019 Pan American Games
Medalists at the 2019 Pan American Games
Olympic medalists in rugby sevens
Medalists at the 2020 Summer Olympics
Olympic bronze medalists for Argentina
Rugby union scrum-halves
Argentina international rugby union players
Argentina international rugby sevens players